WZRF-LP (99.3 FM) was a community low power FM ("LPFM") radio station in Wilmington, North Carolina. The station signed on December 3, 2017 with an album-oriented rock format.

References

External links
Official WZRF-LP Website

ZRF-LP
ZRF-LP